The 2012 Wake Forest Demon Deacons men's soccer team represented Wake Forest University during the 2012 NCAA Division I men's soccer season. It was the 49th season of the program. The Deacons played in the Atlantic Coast Conference, and qualified for the NCAA Tournament, before losing to Coastal Carolina.

Roster 

Source

Competitions

Preseason

Regular season

Standings

Results summary

Match results

ACC Tournament

NCAA Tournament

 Ranking indicates NCAA Tournament seeding.

References 

Wake Forest Demon Deacons
Wake Forest Demon Deacons men's soccer seasons
Wake Forest Demon Deacons
Wake Forest Demon Deacons